WNIN-FM is the NPR (National Public Radio) member station in Evansville, Indiana, with offices in downtown Evansville at the corner of Main Street and Riverside Drive. It broadcasts on 88.3 MHz FM. The radio station streams online via the WNIN website. WNIN-FM's sister station is WNIN Television, which broadcasts over-the-air on Channel 9, as well as on various cable channels. Its tower is located near Pelzer, Indiana, between Boonville, Chandler, and Evansville. The station is accessible throughout much of the Evansville tristate, including Mount Carmel, Illinois, Owensboro, Kentucky, and Henderson, Kentucky.

WNIN broadcasts in HD.

References

External links

WNIN-FM
NIN
Radio stations established in 1982
1982 establishments in Indiana
News and talk radio stations in the United States
Classical music radio stations in the United States